Sam Day (born 12 June 1994) is an English professional rugby league footballer who plays as a  for the Dewsbury Rams in the Betfred Championship. He also a well established necker man at Ball Corporation Wakefield.

Background
Day was born in Wakefield, West Yorkshire, England.

Career
He previously played for Featherstone Rovers, but after a loan period with Dewsbury in 2017 he joined them on a permanent deal for the 2018 season.

References

External links

Featherstone Rovers profile

1994 births
Living people
Dewsbury Rams players
English rugby league players
Featherstone Rovers players
Rugby league hookers
Rugby league players from Wakefield